Anderson Bay is a bay of Atlin Lake in northwestern British Columbia, Canada, located southwest of Pike Bay.

The landscape surrounding Anderson Bay lies in the Atlin Volcanic Field of the Northern Cordilleran Volcanic Province. During the Miocene period, a basaltic lava flow engulfed the southern end of Anderson Bay. Remnants of this lava flow are present as columnar-jointed lava flows.

See also
List of volcanoes in Canada
List of Northern Cordilleran volcanoes
Volcanism of Canada
Volcanism of Western Canada
Volcanic history of the Northern Cordilleran Volcanic Province

References

Bays of British Columbia
Northern Cordilleran Volcanic Province
Atlin District